Portsmouth is a city in Hampshire, England. 

Portsmouth may also refer to:

Places

Canada 
Portsmouth, Kingston, Ontario

Dominica 
Portsmouth, Dominica

United Kingdom
Portsmouth, West Yorkshire
Portsmouth (UK Parliament constituency), a constituency abolished 1918

United States 
Portsmouth, Iowa
Portsmouth, New Hampshire
Portsmouth, North Carolina, a village 
Portsmouth Island, North Carolina
Portsmouth, Ohio
Portsmouth, Portland, Oregon
Portsmouth, Rhode Island
Portsmouth, Virginia
Portsmouth Township, Michigan
Portsmouth Square, a park in San Francisco

Ships 
 HMS Portsmouth, several ships with the name
 USS Portsmouth, several ships with the name
 United States lightship Portsmouth (LV-101)

Sport 
Portsmouth F.C., an English football club
Portsmouth Spartans, a former professional American football franchise, now the Detroit Lions
Portsmouth Invitational Tournament, a basketball tournament
Portsmouth yardstick, a handicapping system for yacht racing

Other uses
"Portsmouth" (instrumental), an English folk tune
Portsmouth Naval Shipyard, a U.S. Navy base in Kittery, Maine
Treaty of Portsmouth, a 1905 treaty ending the Russo-Japanese War

See also
USS Portsmouth, a list of ships